At the 2010 European Athletics Championships, Ukraine entered a team of 61 athletes into the competition's events in Barcelona, Spain.

Among the prominent representatives of Ukraine were reigning Olympic heptathlon champion Nataliya Dobrynska and 2008 Olympic bronze medallist Denys Yurchenko in the pole vault, as well as decathlete Oleksiy Kasyanov, pole vaulter Maksym Mazuryk, and 800 metres runner Yuliya Krevsun – all of whom were fourth in their disciplines at the 2009 World Championships in Athletics. None of the three Ukrainians who won medals at the 2006 European Athletics Championships returned for the 2010 edition.

At the competition, long jumper Olha Saladukha became the country's first gold medallist of the championships. Dobrynska and Mazuryk were both runners-up in their events. The less established Stanislav Melnykov took the 400 metres hurdles bronze medal, while Yelizaveta Bryzhina surprised with a 200 metres personal best for the silver medal.

Results

Team selection

Track and road events

Field and combined events

References 
Participants list (men)
Participants list (women)

Nations at the 2010 European Athletics Championships
2010
European Athletics Championships